Stoyan Stoyanov (born 12 November 1968) is a Bulgarian wrestler. He competed at the 1992 Summer Olympics and the 1996 Summer Olympics.

References

1968 births
Living people
Bulgarian male sport wrestlers
Olympic wrestlers of Bulgaria
Wrestlers at the 1992 Summer Olympics
Wrestlers at the 1996 Summer Olympics
People from Nova Zagora